The Nine of Swords is a Minor Arcana tarot card, also known as the Lord of Cruelty. In many countries around Europe it is used as a game card. This card has the numerical value of nine.

In many countries Tarot cards are believed to tell the future, or have a divination usage. In these countries it is a very negative sign to have this card be turned. It is believed that it being turned can be instigated by others, as it might be coming up to show that one has been cruel to someone nearby.
The first ever card was made in 1776 by Dr James Porter.

Card appearance 
This card has a lot to do with someone's mind and their doubts and pain. The card shows a person, most often a woman, lying down or sitting up but they are or were sleeping. When this card is reversed it can be about real or imagined doubts or pain, just as dreams can be about real or imagined parts of our life. Most often the person on the card is on a bridge symbolizing a person between the worlds of dreaming and reality or also the worlds of life and death.

Above the person lies their fears, hanging above them in an airy or dreamy way; this can be represented through demons, devils or even a heavily agitated night sky. Often there are sharp objects such as swords or knives, representing that a persons fears may pierce or stab through them.  The swords could also mean that they are there to help the person cut through their own difficulties.

Divination usage 
If this card is shown in an upright position, it can mean deception, premonitions and bad dreams, suffering and depression, cruelty, disappointment, violence, loss and scandal. However, all of these may be overcome through faith and calculated inaction. This is the card of the martyr and with it comes new life out of suffering.

This card can represent being plagued by fear, guilt, doubt, and worries that are to a large extent, unfounded. Chances are the person in question is dealing with a problematic situation or a difficult decision, but his or her worst fear is unlikely to materialize.

If the card is shown in an ill-dignified or reversed manner then it has a different meaning. When turned this way it means distrust, suspicion, despair, misery or malice. Total isolation away from comfort and help: institutionalization, suicide, imprisonment and isolation. However, in a generally positive spread, the reversed meaning of this card can also indicate that the nightmare may be ending. The Nine of Swords reversed can actually be a hopeful card, counseling faith in the future and the promise of better days ahead.

References

Suit of Swords